Apache ServiceMix is an  open-source software project to implement a distributed enterprise service bus (ESB).

Architecture 
ServiceMix is based on the service-oriented architecture (SOA) model. It is a project of the Apache Software Foundation and was built on the semantics and application programming interfaces of the Java Business Integration (JBI) specification JSR 208. The software is distributed under the Apache License. ServiceMix supports the OSGi framework. ServiceMix integrated Spring Framework support and can be run at the edge of the network (inside a client or server), as a standalone ESB provider or as a service within another ESB. ServiceMix is compatible with Java Platform, Standard Edition or a Java Platform, Enterprise Edition application server. ServiceMix uses ActiveMQ to provide remoting, clustering, reliability and distributed failover. The basic frameworks used by ServiceMix are Spring and XBean.

ServiceMix is composed  versions of Apache ActiveMQ, Apache Camel, Apache CXF, and Apache Karaf. It was accepted as an official Apache project on September 19, 2007.

References

External links
 

ServiceMix
Enterprise application integration
Java enterprise platform
Service-oriented architecture-related products